Christiane K. Kuhl (born 1966 in Bonn, West Germany) is a German scientist at RWTH Aachen University. She is Head of the Department of Radiology.

Career
Kuhl's research focuses on the improvement of MRI scanning in the detection of breast cancer. She is a member of the Radiological Society of North America and the American Society of Clinical Oncology.

In 2019 she became a member of the German Academy of Sciences Leopoldina.

Political positions
Ahead of the Christian Democrats’ leadership election in 2021, Kuhl publicly endorsed Norbert Röttgen to succeed Annegret Kramp-Karrenbauer as the party’s chair.

References

Living people
Women medical researchers
Place of birth missing (living people)
Academic staff of RWTH Aachen University
German medical researchers
1966 births
Members of the German Academy of Sciences Leopoldina